Fairbridge may refer to:

Charities
Fairbridge, a UK-based charitable organisation supporting disadvantaged children
Fairbridge Western Australia Inc., an Australian youth charity that operates Fairbridge Village in Western Australia

People
Kingsley Fairbridge, South Africa born educator
Rhodes Fairbridge, geologist and son of Kingsley Fairbridge

Places
Fairbridge, a locality in the Australian state of Western Australia

Other
Fairbridge Festival, an annual music festival